Brenda Marie Osbey (born December 12, 1957 in New Orleans) is an American poet. She served as the Poet Laureate of Louisiana from 2005 to 2007.

Life
She graduated from Dillard University, Paul Valéry University, Montpellier III, and from the University of Kentucky, with an M.A.
She has taught at the University of California at Los Angeles, Loyola University New Orleans, and at Dillard University.  She was Visiting Writer-in-residence at Tulane University and Scholar-in-residence at Southern University.  She teaches at Louisiana State University.

Her work has appeared in Callaloo, Obsidian, Essence, Southern Exposure, Southern Review, Epoch, The American Voice, and The American Poetry Review.

Awards
 2004 Carmargo Foundation Fellow 
 1998 American Book Award
 1990 National Endowment for the Arts Creative Writing Fellowship
 1984 Association of Writers & Writing Programs Poetry Award
 1980 Loring-Williams Prize, Academy of American Poets

Works

Anthologies
 
 
 James Gill, ed. 1987 2PLUS2: A Collection of International Writing, Lausanne, Switzerland: Mylabris Press.

References

External links
 "Author's website"
 "Louisiana's Poet Laureate: What Was Lost", NPR
 
 
 

Writers from New Orleans
1957 births
Dillard University alumni
University of Kentucky alumni
University of California, Los Angeles faculty
Loyola University New Orleans faculty
Dillard University faculty
Tulane University faculty
Southern University faculty
Louisiana State University faculty
Living people
American women poets
American Book Award winners
Kentucky women writers
American women academics
21st-century American women